Kakrina is a village in central northern Bulgaria, part of Lovech Municipality, Lovech Province. As of 2008, it has a population of 298.

Kakrina is mainly famous as the site of the Kakrina Inn (Къкринско ханче, Kakrinsko hanche) where national hero Vasil Levski was captured by the Ottoman government in 1872. The inn is today a museum and one of the official 100 Tourist Sites of Bulgaria.

Gallery

Honours
Kakrina Point on Clarence Island, Antarctica is named after the village.

External links

Villages in Lovech Province
Lovech